Draganja is a Croatian surname. Notable people with the surname include:

Duje Draganja (born 1983), Croatian retired swimmer
Marin Draganja (born 1991), Croatian tennis player, older brother of Tomislav
Tomislav Draganja (born 1994), Croatian tennis player, younger brother of Marin

Croatian surnames